Rovira is a town and municipality in the Tolima department of Colombia.  The population of the municipality was 21,822 as of the 1993 census.

References

Municipalities of Tolima Department